Malek Chamoun (born 3 January 1989) is an Australian male weightlifter, competing in the 85 kg category and representing Australia at international competitions. He competed at world championships, most recently at the 2011 World Weightlifting Championships.

Major results

Personal life
Chamoun is legally blind.

References

External links
 
 

1989 births
Living people
Australian male weightlifters
Place of birth missing (living people)
Weightlifters at the 2014 Commonwealth Games
Commonwealth Games competitors for Australia
20th-century Australian people
21st-century Australian people